Johnny Temple is an American bassist, known best for his work in the post-hardcore bands Soulside and Girls Against Boys. Temple also formed a side project with fellow Girls Against Boys member Scott McCloud called New Wet Kojak. In 1996 he founded Akashic Books out of Brooklyn with the intent of publishing works by independent artists.

Biography 
Johnny Temple grew up on 16th Street Northwest in Washington D.C. In high school, he worked at a reggae record store where his interest in music peaked. In college he studied the history, culture, and politics of Black Americans at Wesleyan University, eventually earning a master's degree in social work at Columbia University in New York City.

It was during his second year that Temple began playing bass guitar, with much of his influence being drawn from the punk rock and reggae scene in D.C.

Personal life 
Johnny Temple married in 2002 and has two sons. He has lived in Fort Greene, Brooklyn since 1990 and told The New York Times that one of his "goals in life is to leave Fort Greene as little as possible".

Discography

Soulside

Girls Against Boys

New Wet Kojak

References

External links 
 

Living people
American bass guitarists
American indie rock musicians
Hardcore punk musicians
Post-hardcore musicians
Columbia University School of Social Work alumni
Wesleyan University alumni
Girls Against Boys members
People from Fort Greene, Brooklyn
Year of birth missing (living people)